This is a list of jazz musicians by instrument based on existing articles on Wikipedia. Do not enter names that lack articles. Do not enter names that lack sources.

Accordion
 Kamil Běhounek (1916–1983)
 Luciano Biondini (born 1971)
 Asmund Bjørken (1933–2018)
 Stian Carstensen (born 1971)
 Gabriel Fliflet (born 1958)
 Richard Galliano (born 1950)
 Tommy Gumina (1931–2013)
 Frode Haltli (born 1975)
 Pete Jolly (1932–2004)
 Guy Klucevsek (born 1947)
 Nisse Lind (1904–1941)
 Frank Marocco (1931–2012)
 Mat Mathews (1924–2009)
 Joe Mooney (1911–1975)
 Eivin One Pedersen (1956–2012)
 Leon Sash (1922–1979)
 George Shearing (1919–2011)
 Art Van Damme (1920–2010)

Banjo

Double bass

Bass guitar
 Victor Bailey (1960–2016)
 Brian Bromberg (born 1960)
 Stanley Clarke (born 1951)
 Bob Cranshaw (1932–2016)
 Mark Egan (born 1951)
 Alphonso Johnson (born 1951)
 Bill Laswell (born 1955)
 Marcus Miller (born 1959)
 Monk Montgomery (1921–1982)
 Jaco Pastorius (1951–1987)
 John Patitucci (born 1959)
 Steve Swallow (born 1940)
 Jamaaladeen Tacuma (born 1956)
 Gerald Veasley (born 1955)
 Eberhard Weber (born 1940)

Bassoon
 Garvin Bushell (1902–1991)
 Karen Borca (born 1948)
 Yusef Lateef (1920–2013)
 Illinois Jacquet (1922–2014)
 Makanda Ken McIntyre (1931–2001)
 Frank Tiberi (born 1928)
 Frankie Trumbauer (1901–1956)

Cello
 Harry Babasin (1921–1988)
 Ron Carter (born 1937)
 David Darling (born 1941)
 Richard Davis (born 1930)
 David Eyges (born 1950)
 Nathan Gershman (1917–2008)
 Dave Holland (born 1946)
 Tristan Honsinger (born 1949)
 Sam Jones (1924–1981)
 Fred Katz (1919–2013)
 Diedre Murray (born 1951)
 Oscar Pettiford (1922–1960)
 Hank Roberts (born 1954)
 Abdul Wadud (born 1947)
 Doug Watkins (1934–1962)
 Eberhard Weber (born 1940)

Clarinet
 Woody Allen (born 1935)
 Craig Ball
 Barney Bigard (1906–1980)
 Don Burrows (1928–2020)
 Don Byron (born 1958)
 Evan Christopher (born 1969)
 Anat Cohen (born 1975)
 Eddie Daniels (born 1941)
 Kenny Davern (1935–2006)
 Buddy DeFranco (1923–2014)
 Johnny Dodds (1892–1940)
 Irving Fazola (1912–1949)
 Pete Fountain (1930–2016)
 Victor Goines (born 1961)
 Benny Goodman (1909–1986)
 Edmond Hall (1901–1967)
 Jimmy Hamilton (1917–1994)
 Woody Herman (1913–1987)
 Peanuts Hucko (1918–2003)
 Michael Marcus (born 1952)
 Joe Muranyi (1928–2012)
 Jimmie Noone (1895–1944)
 Ken Peplowski (born 1959)
 Sid Phillips (1902–1973)
 Russell Procope (1908–1981)
 Pee Wee Russell (1906–1969)
 Tony Scott (1921–2007)
 Artie Shaw (1910–2004)
 Bill Smith (1926–2020)
 Putte Wickman (1924–2006)
 Lester Young (1909–1959)

Cornet
 Nat Adderley (1931–2000)
 Louis Armstrong (1901–1971)
 Bix Beiderbecke (1903–1931)
 Buddy Bolden (1877–1931)
 Bobby Hackett (1915–1976)
 Jeff Hughes
 Freddie Keppard (1889–1933)
 Butch Morris (1947–2013)
 Red Nichols (1905–1965)
 Rex Stewart (1907–1967)
 Chris Tyle (born 1955)
 Steamboat Willie (born c. 1950)

Drums

Flugelhorn
 Joe Bishop (1907–1976)
 Art Farmer (1928–1999)
 Freddie Hubbard (1938–2008)
 Thad Jones (1923–1986)
 Chuck Mangione (born 1940)
 Shorty Rogers (1924–1994)
 Clark Terry (1920–2015)
 Kenny Wheeler (1930–2014)

Flute
 Greg Abate (born 1947)
Jane Bunnett (born 1956)
 Wayman Carver (1905–1967)
 Buddy Collette (1921–2010)
 Eric Dolphy (1928–1964)
 Paul Horn (1930–2014)
 Bobby Jaspar (1926–1963)
 Rahsaan Roland Kirk (1935–1977)
 Moe Koffman (1928–2001)
 Byard Lancaster (1942–2012)
 Yusef Lateef (1920–2013)
 Hubert Laws (born 1939)
 Dave Liebman (born 1946)
 Charles Lloyd (born 1938)
 Herbie Mann (1930–2003)
 James Moody (1925–2010)
 Sam Most (1930–2013)
 Gerry Niewood (1943–2009)
 Jerome Richardson (1920–2000)
 Sam Rivers (1923–2011)
 Bruno Romani (born 1960)
 Bud Shank (1926–2009)
 Alberto Socarras (1908–1987)
 Les Spann (1932–1989)
 James Spaulding (born 1937)
 Jeremy Steig (1942–2016)
 Ira Sullivan (1931–2020)
 Lew Tabackin (born 1940)
 Henry Threadgill (born 1944)
 Dave Valentin (1952–2017)
 Frank Wess (1922–2013)

French horn
 David Amram (born 1930)
 Vincent Chancey (born 1950)
 John Clark (born 1944)
 Junior Collins (1927–1976)
 Sharon Freeman
 John Graas (1917–1962)
 Pete Levin (born 1942)
 Willie Ruff (born 1931)
 Gunther Schuller (1925–2015)
 Tom Varner (born 1957)
 Julius Watkins (1921–1977)

Guitar

Harmonica
 Larry Adler (1914–2001)
 William Galison (born 1958)
 Max Geldray (1916–2004)
 Howard Levy (born 1951)
 Grégoire Maret (born 1975)
 Eddie Shu (1918–1986)
 Toots Thielemans (1922–2016)
 Frédéric Yonnet (born 1973)

Harp
 Dorothy Ashby (1932–1986)
 Alice Coltrane (1937–2007)
 Adele Girard (1913–1993)
 Corky Hale (born 1936)
 Deborah Henson-Conant (born 1953)
 Casper Reardon (1907–1941)

Miscellaneous
 Rufus Harley – bagpipes
 Meade Lux Lewis – celeste
 Emmett Chapman – Chapman stick
 Red McKenzie – comb
 Steve Turre – conch shells
 Anthony Braxton – contrabass clarinet
 Paul McCandless – English horn
 Tom Scott – lyricon
 David Grisman – mandolin
 Dave Samuels – marimba
 Hot Lips Page – mellophone
 Scott Robinson – ophicleide
 Pat Metheny – orchestrion
 Charlie Mariano – nadaswaram
 Alphonse Picou – piccolo
 Sidney Bechet – sarrusophone
 Collin Walcott – sitar
 Andy Narell – steel drums
 Django Bates – tenor horn
 Max Roach – timpani
 Cliff Edwards – ukulele
 Herbie Hancock – vocoder

Oboe
 Bob Cooper (1925–1993)
 Yusef Lateef (1920–2013)
 Paul McCandless (born 1947)
 Makanda Ken McIntyre (1931–2001)
 Don Redman (1900–1964)
 Andrew White (1942–2020)

Organ

Piano

Saxophone

Trombone

Trumpet

Tuba
 Bill Barber (1920–2007)
 Pete Briggs (1904–unknown)
 Don Butterfield (1923–2006)
 Red Callender (1916–1992)
 June Cole (1903–1960)
 Ray Draper (1940–1982)
 Ralph Escudero (1898–1970)
 Howard Johnson (born 1941)
 Dick Lammi (1909–1969)
 Cyrus St. Clair (1890–1955)
 Bob Stewart (born 1945)
 Joe Tarto (1902–1986)

Vibraphone

Violin

Vocal

References